Leutnant Rudolf Wendelmuth was a World War I German flying ace credited with 14 aerial victories.

Early life

Rudolf Wendelmuth was born on 28 July 1890 in Gotha, Saxe-Coburg and Gotha, the German Empire.

World War I service

In the Levant

At break of war, Wendelmuth was posted to the 233rd Reserve Infantry Regiment. He transferred to aviation on 1 March 1915, reporting to FEA 3 in his home town of Gotha for training. His first assignment was to Bulgaria in September. In July 1916, he returned to Cologne to Fokker Commando. He was then posted to FA 8 in Sevdi Koy, Turkey as an acting oberleutnant. While with this unit, he scored his first victory, downing a Royal Naval Air Service Farman off the Turkish coast on 5 November 1916.

On the Western Front

During Bloody April 1917, Wendelmuth returned to the Western Front. He was assigned to Jagdstaffel 8. Between 29 July and 14 October 1917, he accumulated another ten victories; during this span, on 25 September, his plane was shot down but he escaped unharmed.

In command

On 19 October, he was appointed to command Royal Prussian Jagdstaffel 20. He scored three more wins in October and November 1917. On 30 November, Wendelmuth died in a midair collision that also killed Wilhelm Schulz of Jagdstaffel 4.

Sources of information

References

 Above the Lines: The Aces and Fighter Units of the German Air Service, Naval Air Service and Flanders Marine Corps 1914 – 1918 Norman L. R. Franks, et al. Grub Street, 1993. , .

1890 births
1917 deaths
People from Gotha (town)
People from Saxe-Coburg and Gotha
Prussian Army personnel
Luftstreitkräfte personnel
Ottoman military personnel of World War I
German World War I flying aces
German military personnel killed in World War I
Aviators killed in aviation accidents or incidents
Recipients of the Iron Cross (1914), 1st class
Victims of aviation accidents or incidents in 1917
Military personnel from Thuringia